The Oil Creek and Titusville Railroad  is a tourist railroad that runs from Titusville to Rynd Farm north of Oil City in the U.S. state of Pennsylvania. The Oil Creek and Titusville Lines  is the designated operator of the railroad, as well as the freight carrier on the line.

History 
The Oil Creek and Titusville operates over tracks that were originally built as the main line of the Buffalo, New York and Philadelphia Railroad in the 1880s; trackage in Titusville was originally owned by the Dunkirk, Allegheny Valley and Pittsburgh Railroad. The Buffalo, New York and Philadelphia was reorganized in 1887 into the Western New York and Pennsylvania Railroad, which was eventually acquired by the Pennsylvania Railroad in 1900. The Pennsylvania was merged with the New York Central Railroad in 1968 and became Penn Central. In 1976, Penn Central went bankrupt, along with several other railroads, and was combined into Conrail. 

In 1986, the line was acquired from Conrail by the Oil Creek Railway Historical Society, with the first tourist trains running on July 18; freight operations began on September 25, 1986. Briefly, from December 2, 1995 to August 1996, the Oil Creek and Titusville operated over the former Conrail main line between Meadville and Corry. The operation and ownership of that line reverted to Conrail before being turned over to the Western New York and Pennsylvania Railroad.

Infrastructure
The OC&T is notable in that it operates the only working Railway Post Office in the United States. For income, it may carry a few freight cars at the end of the passenger cars. The trackage was formerly Conrail and was out of service in 1986 when it was purchased by the founders. The inaugural excursion came in July of that year. It hauls over 1,000 carloads of freight and 15,000 passengers each year.

Stations

Four stations along the line that have been used off and on to present day: Perry Street, Petroleum Centre, Rynd Farm, and Drake Well. It has seven passenger cars converted from powered units and an open-air, gondola car. It has three operating locomotives: MLW M-420 #3568, and Alco S-2's #75 and #85 (the Atlas 50T 00 is not used).

The railway also has a caboose marked O.C.T.R. 10R, plus the Caboose Motel, made up of several cabooses no longer in service.

See also 

 List of heritage railroads in the United States

References

External links 

 Oil Creek and Titusville Lines
 Oil Creek and Titusville Railroad

Heritage railroads in Pennsylvania
Pennsylvania railroads
Railway companies established in 1986
Transportation in Crawford County, Pennsylvania
Transportation in Venango County, Pennsylvania
Titusville, Pennsylvania
1986 establishments in Pennsylvania